The RotorWay 300T Eagle is an American helicopter that was under development by RotorWay International  of Chandler, Arizona, in 2009-2011. The aircraft was intended to be certified and supplied as a complete ready-to-fly-aircraft for the flight training and aerial work markets.

The aircraft was announced at AirVenture 2009, with a first flight then predicted for 2010. The company started taking US$5,000 customer deposits at that time.

Design and development
The 300T Eagle features a single main rotor, a two-seats-in side-by-side configuration enclosed cockpit with a windshield, skid-type landing gear and a  Rolls-Royce RR300-B1 turboshaft engine.

Since the initial announcement of the aircraft in 2009 no further information has been provided by the company and no announcement of a first flight has been made. The company's webpage about the aircraft had been removed by the end of 2011 and the project may have been cancelled.

Specifications (300T Eagle)

References

External links
Archive of the official 300T Eagle page on Archive.org

Abandoned civil aircraft projects of the United States
Single-turbine helicopters
2010s United States helicopters